Tuck Everlasting is a musical based upon the American children's novel Tuck Everlasting by Natalie Babbitt. It features music by Chris Miller, lyrics by Nathan Tysen and a book by Claudia Shear and Tim Federle, with direction and choreography by Casey Nicholaw. The musical had its premiere at the Alliance Theater in Atlanta, Georgia, in 2015. It began Broadway previews on March 31, 2016; and opened on April 26, 2016, at the Broadhurst Theatre, in New York City. The production closed on May 29, 2016, after 39 performances.

Synopsis 
Act 1

The show opens in Treegap, New Hampshire, where the various characters name what they want most in the world: Winnie Foster, to go to the fair; Mae Tuck, to see her sons again; Jesse Tuck, to take in the familiar sights of Treegap; Miles Tuck, to be unstuck in time; and the Man in the Yellow Suit, to "learn the secret" of Treegap Wood and become immortal ("Live Like This"). 

Winnie goes into her house, where she spends most of her time with her mother Betsy, and her grandmother now that her father has died. She wishes for a life bigger than their living room and wants to explore Treegap Wood ("Good Girl, Winnie Foster"). 

After running outside once again, Winnie encounters a parade led by the Man in the Yellow Suit that leads to the fair ("Join the Parade"). Desperate to see the fair, Winnie Foster opens the gate and runs into the Wood after the faint sound of a music box ("Good Girl, Winnie Foster (Reprise)").

There she meets Jesse Tuck, who drinks from the spring. To keep her from doing the same, Jesse offers to show her what he calls the top of the world, as seen from the trees ("Top of the World"). After, he and Miles kidnap Winnie and bring her back to the Tucks' house to keep her from revealing their secret.

Back at the Foster home, Betsy has called on Constable Joe and his son Hugo to search for Winnie ("Hugo's First Case, Parts 1 and 2").

The Tucks, across the wood from the Fosters, tell Winnie the history of the Tuck family, and how they have become immortal by drinking the water in Treegap Wood ("The Story of the Tucks"). Winnie stays the night with the Tucks and, while finding clothes for Winnie to wear, Mae tells her the story of the day when her husband, Angus proposed to her ("My Most Beautiful Day"). Winnie decides that staying in the Tuck family's attic is its own kind of adventure ("The Attic"). Still, she eventually decides to sneak out with Jesse to go to the fair ("Join the Parade (Reprise)").

At the fair, Winnie and Jesse play games and decide to become friends that travel the world together ("Partner in Crime"). They leave the fair and sit on top of the Treegap water tower, where Jesse convinces Winnie to drink the water when she turns seventeen so they can be married ("Seventeen"). The Man in the Yellow Suit overhears Jesse's speech and decides to follow the Tucks to get to the enchanted water.

Act 2

The Man in the Yellow Suit celebrates his victory with those from the traveling fair ("Everything's Golden"). Back at the Tucks' house, Winnie contemplates Jesse's proposal ("Seventeen (Reprise)").

The Tucks discover that Jesse has asked Winnie to drink the water and become angry with him. Winnie talks to Miles about his son Thomas, whom Mae mentioned earlier, and Miles shares how he has not seen Thomas in eighty years ("Time"). The Tucks then lament what it means to be stuck in time forever, and aim to live more fully in the coming years ("Time (Reprise)").

The Man in the Yellow Suit visits the Fosters and convinces Betsy to give Treegap Wood to him if he can safely bring Winnie home ("Everything's Golden (Reprise)"). Constable Joe and Hugo see the Man leaving the Foster home, and remark that you can't trust a man dressed in yellow ("You Can't Trust a Man").

Angus takes Winnie fishing and attempts to convince her to live a mortal life instead of drinking the water with Jesse ("The Wheel"). Miles approaches and tells them that Jesse has gone without saying goodbye, and Winnie says they can find him at the spring in Treegap Wood. There, Jesse encounters the Man in the Yellow Suit who tells him of his long journey to find the spring and forces Jesse to take him there ("The Story of the Man in the Yellow Suit"). The Tucks and Winnie find Jesse, and the Man in the Yellow Suit offers to make them partners in his water-selling business. After the Man takes Winnie hostage, Jesse offers him a vial of water in exchange for her; before he can drink it, however, Mae hits him on the head with a rifle and kills him instantly. When Constable Joe and Hugo arrive, Winnie tells them that she killed the Man in the Yellow Suit when he tried to pull a knife on her and Jesse.

Close to being exposed, the Tucks leave town on the advice of Constable Joe. They say goodbye to Winnie and offer her their music box, thanking her for reminding them that there is "still something to live for." Jesse says he will leave instructions on how to find him and leaves her with a vial of water from the spring. Winnie contemplates drinking the water and what it means to live forever ("Everlasting"). She ultimately decides to live out her mortal life and pours the water on her toad instead.

Through a ballet sequence, the ensemble shows the remainder of Winnie's life: she marries Hugo and has a son, while her grandmother, Constable Joe, and Betsy pass away one by one. Before she dies, Winnie opens the Tucks' music box and dances one last time at the gate of the Foster home as she did when she was young.

The Tucks return to Treegap after Winnie has died and discover her grave, which is dedicated to a "cherished wife, devoted mother, and dearest grandmother." They celebrate the fact that she lived a full life and encounter the toad Winnie made immortal with the water from the spring ("The Wheel (Reprise)").

Production history and early reviews 
Tuck Everlasting was originally slated to make its world premiere at the Colonial Theatre, in Boston, Massachusetts, from July 28 to August 28, 2013, with Sadie Sink as Winnie Foster. However, the premiere was cancelled because of “a lack of theatre availability for its planned subsequent production in New York." It subsequently made its world premiere at the Alliance Theater in Atlanta, Georgia. The production ran from January 21 to February 22, 2015.

In its review of the Atlanta production, the New York Times said "Indeed, the most dazzling passage is probably the culminating ballet, wordlessly conveying the circle of life, as it were, without benefit of spectacular puppetry and a familiar pop song. It had the woman next to me repeatedly wiping away tears, and I understood how she felt." Variety said "Despite its existentialism-lite sweep, this is an intimate family story of love, loss and the purpose and power of storytelling in the American folk tradition of Twain and Wilder."

The musical began its Broadway previews on March 31, 2016 at the Broadhurst Theatre, with opening night on April 26, 2016. The production closed on May 29, 2016 after 28 previews and 39 regular performances.

Musical numbers

Atlanta premiere 
The musical numbers which appeared in the original 2015 Alliance Theatre production in Atlanta, were:

 “Live Like This”
 "Good Girl, Winnie Foster”
 “Come to the Fair”
 “Top of the World”
 “Story of the Tucks”
 “My Most Beautiful Day”
 “One Small Story”
 “Time”
 “Jump the Line”
 “Seventeen”
 "Everything’s Golden”
 “For the Best”
 “You Can’t Trust a Man”
 “The Wheel”
 “Everlasting”
 “Everlasting Ballet”

Broadway 
Source: Internet Broadway Database

Act 1:
 "Live Like This”- Mae, Winnie, Angus, Jesse, Miles, Man in the Yellow Suit, Ensemble
 "Good Girl, Winnie Foster” – Winnie, Mothers
 “Join the Parade" – Man in the Yellow Suit, Fair Musicians
 “Good Girl, Winnie Foster (Reprise)" – Winnie
 "Top of the World" – Jesse, Winnie
 "Hugo's First Case" – Hugo
 "Story of the Tucks" – Mae, Jesse, Miles
 “My Most Beautiful Day” – Mae, Angus, Ensemble
 "The Attic" – Winnie
 "Join the Parade" (Reprise) – Man in the Yellow Suit, Ensemble
 "Partner in Crime" – Winnie, Jesse, Ensemble
 "Seventeen” – Jesse, Winnie, Man in the Yellow Suit, Ensemble

Act 2:
 "Everything’s Golden" – Man in the Yellow Suit, Ensemble
 "Seventeen" (Reprise) – Winnie
 "Time" – Miles
 "Time (Reprise)" – Miles, Mae, Angus, Jesse
 "Everything's Golden" (Reprise) – Man in the Yellow Suit
 "You Can’t Trust a Man" – Constable Joe, Hugo
 "The Wheel" – Angus, Winnie, Ensemble
 "Story of the Man in the Yellow Suit" – Man in the Yellow Suit
 "Everlasting” – Winnie
 "The Story of Winnie Foster" – Orchestra
 "The Wheel" (Reprise) – Company

World premiere and original Broadway casts

Principal characters and casts

Honors and awards

World Premiere Atlanta production

Original Broadway production

References

External links 
 
 Tuck Everlasting at Internet Broadway Database

Broadway musicals
2015 musicals
Musicals based on novels